Jean-Christophe Beaulieu (also known as 'J.C Beaulieu') (born May 6, 1990) is a Canadian football fullback who is currently a free agent. He was drafted by the Montreal Alouettes in the sixth round of the 2014 CFL Draft. He played CIS football at the Université de Sherbrooke.

College career
Beaulieu played in nine games for the Sherbrooke Vert et Or during his senior year in 2013, rushing for 55 yards and three touchdowns on 19 carries. He also caught four passes for 34 yards and one touchdown.

Professional career

Montreal Alouettes 
Beaulieu was selected by the Montreal Alouettes with the 49th pick in the 2014 CFL Draft. He signed with the team on May 27, 2014. He played in ten games for the Alouettes in 2014, rushing for two yards on one carry and catching two passes for ten yards. Beaulieu also blocked a punt. He started eighteen games in 2015, recording five receptions for 65 yards and a touchdown. He signed a three-year deal with the Alouettes on February 1, 2016. In four seasons with Montreal Beaulieu was used sparingly on offense; he carried the ball 11 times for 104 yards with one touchdown, he also caught 23 passes for 202 yards with one touchdown.

Ottawa Redblacks 
On January 30, 2018 Beaulieu was traded to the Ottawa Redblacks in exchange for Patrick Lavoie. Beauliey was released on March 2, 2020.

References

External links
Just Sports Stats

1977 births
Living people
Canadian football fullbacks
French Quebecers
Sherbrooke Vert et Or football players
Montreal Alouettes players
Players of Canadian football from Quebec
Sportspeople from Trois-Rivières
Ottawa Redblacks players